Rai Bahadur Surya Kumar Bhuyan MBE (1892–1964) was a writer, historian, educator, social activist, storyteller, essayist, professor and a poet from Assam. He has written many books on ancient history, stories, essays, biographies, etc. in the world of Assamese literature. He presided over the Asam Sahitya Sabha (1953) held at Shillong. He was the elected member of Rajya Sabha during 1952–53, and was awarded the Padma Shri by the Government of India in 1956.

Life history and achievements
Bhuyan was born on 27 January 1892 to Rabilal Bhuyan and Bhubaneshwari Bhuyan at Fauzdaripatty, in Nagaon district, Assam. His mother died when he was young.  His father's two brothers, Kankalal Bhuyan and Matilal Bhuyan, as well as Bhubaneshwari Bhuyan, died during the black fever of the late nineteenth century. Surya Kumar Bhuyan was raised by his grandmothers, Pahita and Labita. His father was the Chief District Magistrate of Nagaon district. He began his education at Nagaon but in 1904, moved to Shillong. He graduated from the Shillong Government School in 1909. In 1913, he completed his Bachelor of Arts degree in the Presidency College, Calcutta, and in 1916, completed his master's degree English in the Calcutta University. He started his career as a teacher in Jorhat Mission School. In 1918, he was appointed as a lecturer in Cotton College at Guwahati. In 1936, Bhuyan went to England to work on his PhD at the London School of Oriental and African Studies. Bhuyan became the first Assamese to be the Principal of the Cotton College, Guwahati. After which, Bhuyan began to resuscitate the Buranjis and formulate a distinct past for Assam, against its inclusion within the framework of the Indian state. In this, he continued the work of Sir Edward Gait, collecting historical manuscripts from old families and converting them into a readable format. Bhuyan served as the second President of the Governing Body of Nowgong College. He retired as the DPI Assam and took charge as the Vice Chancellor of Gauhati University.

Personal life
Surya Kumar Bhuyan married Laksheshwari Bhuyan on 14 February 1917. They had six children.

Literary works

Surya Kumar Bhuyan compiled, collated, and edited a number of books and articles in the Assamese language. He also wrote a few books in English and Bengali, which include:

Historical books
 Kamrupar Buranji (কামৰূপৰ বুৰঞ্জী; 1930)
 Deodhai Assam Buranji (দেওধাই অসম বুৰঞ্জী; 1932)
 Assamar Padya Buranji (অসমৰ পদ্য বুৰঞ্জী; 1932)
 Padshah Buranji (পদসাহ বুৰঞ্জী; 1935)
 Kachari Buranji (কছাৰী বুৰঞ্জী; 1936)
 Jayantia Buranji (জয়ন্তীয়া বুৰঞ্জী)
 Tripura Buranji (ত্ৰিপুৰা বুৰঞ্জী)
 Satsari Assam Buranji (সাতসৰী অসম বুৰঞ্জী)
 Konwar Bidroh (কোৱৰ বিদ্ৰোহ; 1948)
 Mirjumlar Asom Akramon (মিৰজুমলাৰ অসম আক্ৰমণ; 1956)

Biographical works in Assamese
 Gopal Krishna Gokhle (গোপাল কৃষ্ণ গোখলে; 1961)
 Ahomar Din (আহোমৰ দিন; 1918)
 Robindra Nath Thakur (ৰবীন্দ্ৰ নাথ ঠাকুৰ; 1920)
 Anandaram Baruah (আনন্দৰাম বৰুৱা; 1920)
 Jonaki (জোনাকী; 1928)
 Chaneki (চানেকী; 1928)
 Asom Jiyori (অসম জীয়ৰী; 1935)
 Rajeswar Singha (ৰাজেশ্বৰ সিংহ; 1974)
 Ramoni Gabharu (ৰমনী গাভৰু; 1951)
 Swargadeu Godadhor Singha (স্বৰ্গদেউ গদাধৰ সিংহ)
 Anandaram Dhekial Phukan (আনন্দৰাম ঢেকীয়াল ফুকন)
 Jagannath Barua (জগন্নাথ বৰুৱা)
 Sir Edward Gait (চাৰ এডৱাৰ্ড গেইট) etc.

Creative works in Assamese
 Nirmali (নিৰ্মালি; 1918) (collection of poems)
 Panchami (পঞ্চমী; 1927) (short story collection)
 Tripodi (ত্ৰিপদী; 1960) (collection of articles written on literature)

Books in English
 An Assamese Nurjahan (1926) 
 Tungkhungia Buranji (1932) 
 Assamese Historical Literature
 Kartuya
 An Account of Assam
 Preliminary Report on the old Record at Assam Secretariat
 Lachit Barphukan and his times 
 Annal of Delhi Badsahai
 Anglo Assamese Relations (1937) 
 The Seven Hindrances (1937)
 Atan Buragohain and his times (1937) 
 Studies in the Literature of Assam (1937)
 Catalogue of Historical writings (1955)

Books in Bengali
 Bangla Vashai Oxomor Itihaas (বাংলা ভাষায় আসামেৰ ইতিহাস)
 Obosane Ahom Rajotwo (অবসানে আহোম ৰাজত্ব)
 Kabyoroshik Boiganiker Atmochorit (কাব্যৰসিক বৈজ্ঞানিকেৰে আত্মচৰিত)
 Europot Oxomor Jyotish Sutro (য়ুৰোপত অসমৰ জ্যোতিষ সূত্ৰ)

Awards
 Padma Shri award, the fourth-highest civilian award from the Government of India in the field of Literature and Education in 1956.
 Rai Bahadur, the title honored by the ruling British government in 1933.
Member of the Order of the British Empire (MBE) in the 1946 Birthday Honours.

Death
Dr. Surya Kumar Bhuyan died on 5 July 1964 at the American Baptist Mission Hospital in Chhatribari of America. At the time of demise, he left his wife Laksheshwari Bhuyan, three sons and three daughters and a few grandchildren.

See also
 Assamese literature
 List of people from Assam
 List of Asam Sahitya Sabha presidents
 List of Assamese writers with their pen names

References

External links
 Some poems of the author (in Assamese) at xophura.net.

1890s births
1964 deaths
Asom Sahitya Sabha Presidents
Assamese-language poets
People from Nagaon district
Presidency University, Kolkata alumni
Rajya Sabha members from Assam
Recipients of the Padma Shri in literature & education
Members of the Order of the British Empire
University of Calcutta alumni
Scholars from Assam
Writers from Northeast India
20th-century Indian poets
20th-century Indian historians
Poets from Assam